The Church St. Nicholas, Beljakovce (Црква „Свети Никола“  Бељаковце) is an Eastern Orthodox church in Beljakovce, Kumanovo, North Macedonia.

References

Eastern Orthodox church buildings in North Macedonia
Macedonian Orthodox churches
Kumanovo Municipality